Rekesh Chauhan is a British Indian pianist and music composer.

Education
Chauhan studied Economics at the University of Leicester.

Career 
Chauhan combines eastern and western musical styles.
He has performed at both the Royal Albert Hall and Birmingham Symphony Hall and collaborated with Rahat Fateh Ali Khan,  Talvin Singh and Soumik Datta. Chauhan has released two studio albums. His debut classical album Beyond Roots was featured by BBC Radio.

Awards and recognition
Alumnus of the Year 2019 Award by Leicester University
Young Musician of the Year 2018 at the National Indian Art Awards held at the Queen Elizabeth Hall.

References

Year of birth missing (living people)
Living people
British classical pianists
Alumni of the University of Leicester